Austrophya mystica, known as a rainforest mystic, is a species of dragonfly in the family Austrocorduliidae, endemic to north-eastern Australia.

Austrophya mystica is a small and slender, bronze-black dragonfly,
which inhabits rainforest streams.

Gallery

See also
 List of Odonata species of Australia

References

Austrocorduliidae
Odonata of Australia
Endemic fauna of Australia
Taxa named by Robert John Tillyard
Insects described in 1909